Mid Scotland and Fife  may refer to:

 Mid Scotland and Fife (European Parliament constituency)
 Mid Scotland and Fife (Scottish Parliament electoral region)